Linthstrasse is a stadium in Tuggen, Canton Schwyz, Switzerland.  It is currently used for football matches and is the home ground of FC Tuggen. The capacity is 2,800 spectators, with 300 seats and 2,500 standing places.

See also 
List of football stadiums in Switzerland

References

External links
FC Tuggen site 
sportfotos.ch profile 
Stadionwelt photos

Football venues in Switzerland
Buildings and structures in the canton of Schwyz
Tuggen